Roux-Estève's blind snake (Myriopholis rouxestevae) is a species of snake in the Typhlopidae family. It is endemic to Cameroon. The specific name honours Rolande Roux-Estève, who provided the first description of this taxon in 1974 but did not formally describe it as a new species.

References

 https://reptile-database.reptarium.cz/species?genus=Myriopholis&species=rouxestevae

Afrotyphlops
Snakes of Africa
Reptiles of Cameroon
Endemic fauna of Cameroon
Reptiles described in 2019
Taxa named by Jean-François Trape